The 2020 African Nations Championship, known as CHAN 2020 for short and the Total African Nations Championship for sponsorship purposes, was the 6th edition of the biennial association football tournament organized by the Confederation of African Football (CAF), featuring national teams consisting of players from their respective national leagues. It was held in Cameroon from 16 January to 7 February 2021.

Originally scheduled from 4 to 25 April 2020, CAF announced its postponement on 17 March 2020 to a later date due to the COVID-19 pandemic in Africa, eventually rescheduling it to January 2021 on 30 June that year.

Morocco defeated Mali in the final to successfully defend their title, thus joining DR Congo as the tournament's most successful nations as well as being the first team to win it back-to-back or twice in a row.

Host selection
Ethiopia were originally officially appointed to host the tournament on 4 February 2018 after the final of the previous edition in Morocco, but the country's football federation admitted it wasn't ready so it was handed over to Cameroon instead. Originally scheduled for January and February 2020, it was postponed to April 2020 and then to January and February 2021.

After inspecting all stadia and infrastructure, CAF delivered a satisfactory certificate to Cameroon in which they indicated the percentage of attendance in line with health exigencies outlined by FIFA. Twenty five percent of spectators were admitted in the different stadia during the group stage of the competition and about 50% spectator increament the knock-out phases.

Qualification

The qualification rounds took place in 2019. Djibouti and Gabon were banned as they withdrew during the qualification for the previous edition. The former, along with original hosts Ethiopia were later reinstated.

Qualified teams
The following 16 teams qualified for the final tournament:

Tunisia withdrew from the tournament despite qualification. CAF invited Libya, whom Tunisia defeated to qualify, and gave them a deadline of 28 January 2020 to decide whether or not to participate in place of Tunisia. Libya accepted the invitation and Tunisia were fined $75,000 and banned from participating in the qualification rounds of the next edition.

Venues
Matches were held in 4 venues across 3 cities: Yaoundé, Limbe and Douala. The fixtures were announced on 24 February 2020.

Squads

Each squad can contain a maximum of 23 players (Regulations Article 72).

Match officials
The following 43 match officials officiated during the 2020 African Nations Championship.

Referees

 Lahlou Benbraham
 George Gatogato
 Pacifique Ndabihawenimana
 Sidi Alioum
 Jean-Jacques Ndala
 Mahmoud El Banna   (+ VAR) 
 Mohamed Marouf
 (Ms) Lidya Tafesse
 Daniel Laryea
 Peter Waweru
 Andofetra Rakotojaona
 Adil Zourak  (+ VAR)
 Boubou Traoré
 Beida Dahane  (+ VAR)
 Ahmad Imtehaz Heeralall
 Samir Guezzaz
 Jean Claude Ishimwe
 Sadok Selmi

Assistant referees

 Jerson Dos Santos (+ AVAR)
 Elvis Noupue (+ AVAR)
 (Ms) Carine Atezambong Fomo
 Issa Yaya
 Liban Abdirazack Ahmed
 Oliver Safari
 Mahmoud Abouelregal (+ AVAR)
 Boris Ditsoga
 Abdul Aziz Jawo
 Gilbert Cheruiyot
 Attia Amsaaed
 Lionel Andrianantenaina
 (Ms) Bernadettar Kwimbira
 Mostafa Akarkad
 Zakaria Brinsi 
 Abdoul Aziz Saley
 Mimisen Iyorhe
 Samuel Pwadutakam
 James Emile
 Mohammed Abdallah Ibrahim (+ AVAR)
 Kahalil Hassani (+ AVAR)
 Zakhele Siwela (+ AVAR)

Video assistant referees

 Bamlak Tessema Weyesa
 Bakary Gassama
 Haythem Guirat
 Janny Sikazwe

Draw
The draw of this edition of the tournament was held at the Polyvalent Sports Center of Yaoundé in Yaoundé on 17 February 2020 at 19:00 WAT (UTC+1). The 16 teams were drawn into 4 groups of 4 and were allocated into 4 pots, with the hosts Cameroon seeded in position A1 of Group A1 and the defending champions Morocco seeded in position C1 of Group C.

Group stage
The top two teams of each group advance to the quarter-finals.

Tiebreakers
Teams are ranked according to points (3 points for a win, 1 point for a draw, 0 points for a loss), and if tied on points, the following tiebreaking criteria are applied, in the order given, to determine the rankings (Regulations Article 74):
Points in head-to-head matches among tied teams;
Goal difference in head-to-head matches among tied teams;
Goals scored in head-to-head matches among tied teams;
If more than two teams are tied, and after applying all head-to-head criteria above, a subset of teams are still tied, all head-to-head criteria above are reapplied exclusively to this subset of teams;
Goal difference in all group matches;
Goals scored in all group matches;
Drawing of lots.

All times are local, WAT (UTC+1).

Group A

Group B

Group C

Group D

Knockout stages
In the knockout stages, extra time and penalty shoot-out are used to decide the winner if necessary, except for the third place match where penalty shoot-out (no extra time) is used to decide the winner if necessary (Regulations Article 75).

Bracket

Quarter-finals

Semi-finals

Third place match

Final

Goalscorers

Awards
The following awards were given at the conclusion of the tournament:

Team of the Tournament

Man of the match

Tournament team rankings

References

External links
The official home of the 6th CHAN edition at CAFOnline.com

 
African Nations Championship
2021 in African football
January 2021 sports events in Africa
February 2021 sports events in Africa
2021 in Cameroonian sport
International association football competitions hosted by Cameroon
Association football events postponed due to the COVID-19 pandemic
Sport in Douala
Sport in Yaoundé
Events in Yaoundé